Yellow-green algae or the Xanthophyceae (xanthophytes) are an important group of heterokont algae. Most live in fresh water, but some are found in marine and soil habitats. They vary from single-celled flagellates to simple colonial and filamentous forms. Xanthophyte chloroplasts contain the photosynthetic pigments chlorophyll a, chlorophyll c, β-carotene, and the carotenoid diadinoxanthin. Unlike other heterokonts, their chloroplasts do not contain fucoxanthin, which accounts for their lighter colour. Their storage polysaccharide is chrysolaminarin. Xanthophyte cell walls are produced of cellulose and hemicellulose. They appear to be the closest relatives of the brown algae.

Classifications
The species now placed in the Xanthophyceae were formerly included in the Chlorophyceae. In 1899, Lüther created the group Heterokontae for green algae with unequal flagella. Pascher (1914) included the Heterokontae in the Chrysophyta. In 1930, Allorge renamed the group as Xanthophyceae.

The monadoid (unicellular flagellates) and also sometimes the amoeboid species have been included by some authors in the Protozoa or Protista, as order Heterochloridina (e.g., Doflein and Reichenow, 1927-1929), as class Xanthomonadina, with orders Heterochloridea and Rhizochloridea (e.g., Deflandre, 1956), as order Heterochlorida (e.g., Hall, 1953, Honigberg et al., 1964), as order Heteromonadida (e.g., Leedale, 1983), or as subclass Heterochloridia (e.g., Puytorac et al., 1987). These groups are called ambiregnal protists, as names for these have been published under either or both of the ICZN and the ICN.

AlgaeBase (2020)
Xanthophyceae have been divided into the following five orders in some classification systems:

 Dictyosphaeriopsis
 Groenlandiella
 Halosphaeropsis
 Pelagocystis
 Polyedrium
 Pseudopleurochloris
 Raphidosphaera
 Sphaerochloris
 Tiresias
 Order Botrydiales Schaffner 1922
 Family Botrydiaceae Rabenhorst 1863
 Asterosiphon
 Botrydium
 Polychloris 
 Order Mischococcales Fritsch 1927
 Family Botrydiopsidaceae Hibberd 1980
 Botrydiopsis
 Excentrochloris
 Perone
 Family Botryochloridaceae Pascher 1938
 Botryochloris 
 Chlorellidiopsis 
 Chlorellidium 
 Ducellieria 
 Heterodesmus 
 Ilsteria 
 Raphidiella 
 Sphaerosorus
 Tetraktis
 Family Centritractaceae Pascher 1937
 Bumilleriopsis 
 Centritractus 
 Pseudotetraëdron 
 Family Characiopsidaceae Pascher 1938
 Characiopsis 
 Chlorokoryne 
 Chlorothecium 
 Chytridiochloris 
 Dioxys 
 Harpochytrium 
 Hemisphaerella 
 Lutherella 
 Peroniella 
 Family Chloropediaceae Pascher 1931
 Chloropedia 
 Family Gloeobotrydaceae Pascher 1937
 Chlorosaccus
 Asterogloea
 Dictyosphaeriopsis
 Gaumiella
 Gloeobotrys
 Gloeoskene
 Gloeosphaeridium
 Merismogloea
 Family Gloeopodiaceae Pascher 1938
 Gloeopodium
 Family Mischococcaceae Pascher 1912
 Mischococcus 
 Family Ophiocytiaceae Lemmermann 1899
 Ophiocytium
 Family Pleurochloridaceae Pascher 1937
 Acanthochloris
 Actinellipsoidion
 Arachnochloris
 Aulakochloris
 Bracchiogonium
 Chlorallanthus
 Chlorapion
 Chlorarkys
 Chloridella
 Chlorocloster
 Chlorogibba
 Diachros
 Endochloridion
 Isthmochloron
 Keriosphaera
 Leuvenia 
 Meringosphaera
 Monallanthus
 Monodus
 Nephrodiella
 Osterhoutia
 Pleurochloridella
 Pleurochloris
 Pleurogaster
 Polyedriella
 Polygoniochloris
 Prismatella
 Pseudogoniochloris
 Pseudopolyedriopsis
 Rhomboidella 
 Schilleriella
 Skiadosphaera
 Sklerochlamys
 Tetraplektron
 Trachychloron
 Family Trypanochloridaceae Geitler ex Pascher 1938
 Trypanochloris 
 Order Rhizochloridales Pascher 1925
 Garciamyxa
 Herreramyxa
 Requejomyxa 
 Family Myxochloridaceae Pascher 1937
 Myxochloris 
 Family Rhizochloridaceae Pascher 1925
 Aldavemyxa 
 Heterocalycina 
 Rhizochloris 
 Family Stipitococcaceae Pascher ex Smith 1933
 Rhizolekane 
 Stipitococcus 
 Stipitoporos 
 Order Tribonematales Pascher 1939
 Family Heterodendraceae Pascher 1939
 Heterodendron 
 Family Heteropediaceae Hibberd 1982 
 Capitulariella 
 Chaetopedia 
 Heterococcus 
 Heteropedia 
 Sphagnoikos 
 Family Neonemataceae Ettl 1977
 Neonema 
 Family Tribonemataceae West 1904
 Brachynematella 
 Bumilleria 
 Tribonema 
 Family Xanthonemataceae Silva 1980
 ?Hormotheca 
 Heterotrichella 
 Xanthonema 
 Order Vaucheriales Nägeli ex Bohlin 1901
 Family Vaucheriaceae (Gray) Dumortier 1822
 Pseudodichotomosiphon
 Vaucheria
 Vaucheriella

Lüther (1899)
Classification according to Lüther (1899):

 Class Heterokontae
 Order Chloromonadales
 Order Confervales

Pascher (1912)
Classification according to Pascher (1912):

 Heterokontae
 Heterochloridales
 Heterocapsales
 Heterococcales
 Heterotrichales
 Heterosiphonales

Fritsch (1935)
Fritsch (1935) recognizes the following orders in the class Xanthophyceae:

Order Heterochloridales
 Suborder Heterochlorineae
 Family Heterochloridaceae (e.g., Heterochloris)
 Suborder Heterocapsineae
 Family Heterocapsaceae (e.g., Chlorogloea)
 Suborder Heterodendrineae
 Family Mischococcaceae (e.g., Mischococcus)
 Suborder Heterorhizidineae
 Family Heterorhizidaceae (e.g., Rhizolekane)
Order Heterococcales
 Family Halosphaeraceae (e.g., Halosphaera)
 Family Myxochloridaceae (e.g., Myxochloris)
 Family Chlorobotrydaceae(e.g., Chlorobotrys)
 Family Chlorotheciaceae (e.g., Chlorothecium)
 Family Ophiocytiaceae (e.g., Ophiocytium)
Order Heterotrichales
 Family Tribonemataceae (e.g., Tribonema)
 Family Heterocloniaceae (e.g., Heterodendron[?])
Order Heterosiphonales
 Family Botrydiaceae (e.g., Botrydium)

Smith (1938)
In the classification of Smith (1938), there are six orders in the class Xanthophyceae, placed in the division Chrysophyta:

Order Heterochloridales (e.g., Chlorochromonas)
Order Rhizochloridales (e.g., Chlorarachnion)
Order Heterocapsales (e.g., Chlorosaccus)
Order Heterotrichales (e.g., Tribonema)
Order Heterococcales (e.g., Botrydiopsis)
Order Heterosiphonales (e.g., Botrydium)

Pascher (1939)

Pascher (1939) recognizes 6 classes in Heterokontae:
Class Heterochloridineae
Class Rhizochloridineae
Class Hetcrocapsineae
Class Heterococcincae
Class Hetcrotrichineae
Class Heterosiphonineae

Copeland (1956)
Copeland (1956) treated the group as order Vaucheriacea:

 Kingdom Protoctista
 Phylum Phaeophyta
 Class Heterokonta
 Order Vaucheriacea
 Family Chlorosaccacea
 Family Mischococcacea
 Family Chlorotheciacea
 Family Botryococcacea
 Family Stipitococcacea
 Family Chloramoebacea
 Family Tribonematacea
 Family Phyllosiphonacea

Ettl (1978), van den Hoek et al. (1995)

In a classification presented by van den Hoek, Mann and Jahns (1995), based on the level of organization of the thallus, there are seven orders:

 Order Chloramoebales (e.g., Chloromeson) - flagellate organisms
 Order Rhizochloridales (e.g., Rhizochloris, Myxochloris) - ameboid organisms
 Order Heterogloeales (e.g., Gloeochloris) - palmelloid (tetrasporal) organisms
 Order Mischococcales (e.g., Chloridella, Botrydiopsis, Characiopsis, Ophiocytium) - coccoid organisms
 Order Tribonematales (e.g., Tribonema, Heterococcus, Heterodendron) - filamentous organization
 Order Botrydiales (e.g., Botrydium) - siphonous organization; sexual reproduction isogamous or anisogamous
 Order Vaucheriales (e.g., Vaucheria) - siphonous organization; sexual reproduction oogamous

These are the same orders of the classification of Ettl (1978), an updated version of the classic work by Pascher (1939). Ultrastructural and molecular studies shows that the Mischococcales might be paraphyletic, and the Tribonematales and Botrydiales polyphyletic, and suggests two orders at most be used until the relationships within the division are sorted.

Maistro et al. (2009)
Informal groups, according to Maistro et al. (2009):
 Botrydiopsalean clade
 Chlorellidialean clade
 Tribonematalean clade
 Vaucherialean clade

Unicellular flagellates, amoeboid and palmelloid taxa were not included in this study.

Adl et al. (2005, 2012)
According to Adl et al. (2005, 2012):
 Tribonematales (genera Botrydium, Bumilleriopsis, Characiopsis, Chloromeson, Heterococcus, Ophiocytium, Sphaerosorus, Tribonema, Xanthonema)
 Vaucheriales (genus Vaucheria)

See also

 Coccolithophore
 Cyanobacteria
 Diatom

References